Pyrrhia treitschkei is a moth of the family Noctuidae. It is found in Turkey, the Caucasus, the Balkans, Iran and the Levant (only recorded from Lebanon and Israel.

Adults are on wing from May to June. There is one generation per year.

The larvae feed on Scutellaria peregrina.

External links
Lepiforum.de

Heliothinae
Moths of Europe
Moths of the Middle East